The Black Volta or Mouhoun is a river that flows through Burkina Faso for approximately 1,352 km (840 mi) to the White Volta in Dagbon, Ghana, the upper end of Lake Volta. The source of the Black Volta is in the Cascades Region of Burkina Faso, close to Mount Tenakourou, the highest point of the country. Further downstream it forms part of the border between Ghana and Burkina Faso, and later between Côte d'Ivoire and Ghana. Within Ghana, it forms the border between the Savannah and the Bono regions. The Bui Dam, a hydroelectric power plant, is built on the river, just south of the Bui National Park, which the river bisects.

References

Volta River
Rivers of Ghana
Lake Volta
Rivers of Burkina Faso
International rivers of Africa
Ghana–Ivory Coast border
Burkina Faso–Ghana border
Rivers of Ivory Coast
Border rivers

de:Volta (Fluss)#Schwarzer Volta